William Laurence Tierney (August 6, 1876 – April 13, 1958) was a Democratic member of the United States House of Representatives from Connecticut's 4th congressional district from 1931 to 1933.

Early life 
Tierney was born in Norwalk, Connecticut, Tierney attended the public schools. He was graduated from Fordham University, New York City, in 1898 and from New York Law School in 1900.

He was admitted to the bar in 1900 and commenced practice in New York City. He moved to Denver, Colorado, in 1905 and to Greenwich, Connecticut in 1912, continuing the practice of law. He served as judge of Greenwich court 1912-1914.

Political career 
Tierney served in the Seventy-second Congress from March 4, 1931 to March 3, 1933. He was an unsuccessful candidate for reelection in 1932 to the Seventy-third Congress. He resumed the practice of law in Greenwich, Connecticut, and New York City.

He was State counsel for the Home Owners' Loan Corporation in 1934 and 1935. He engaged in banking and the practice of law in Greenwich, Connecticut, until his death there April 13, 1958. He was interred in St. Mary's Cemetery.

External links

References

1876 births
1958 deaths
Fordham University alumni
New York Law School alumni
Politicians from Norwalk, Connecticut
Politicians from Denver
People from Greenwich, Connecticut
Democratic Party members of the United States House of Representatives from Connecticut